Gerald Hugh Stranraer-Mull (born 1942) is a retired Anglican priest who was Dean of St Andrew's Cathedral, Aberdeen from 1988 to 2008.

Stranraer-Mull was educated at Woodhouse Grove School, King's College London and St Augustine's College, Canterbury and ordained in 1971. After a curacy in Hexham he served at Ellon, Corbridge and Cruden Bay.

References

1942 births
Living people
Deans of Aberdeen and Orkney
Alumni of St Augustine's College, Canterbury
20th-century Scottish Episcopalian priests
21st-century Scottish Episcopalian priests
Alumni of King's College London
People educated at Woodhouse Grove School